Yale is one of the world's oldest lock manufacturers, owned by its parent company, Assa Abloy. Over its extensive history, Yale has received patents for dozens of its products, and the company has distributed its products to more than 120 countries, including Australia, Greece, India, Kuwait, and others. Yale's headquarters are located in Stockholm, Sweden.

History 

In 1868, the business was founded in Stamford, Connecticut, by Henry R. Towne and Linus Yale Jr., an inventor of the pin tumbler lock. The founding name of the corporation was Yale Lock Manufacturing Co. and later the name was changed to Yale & Towne, basing themselves in Newport, New York..

From 1843 to 1857, Yale had registered eight patents, such as pin tumbler safe lock, safe lock, bank lock, vault, safe door bolt and padlock with the U.S. Patent and Trademark Office. Around 1876, they have added the manufacturing of chain blocks, electric hoists, cranes and testing machines, becoming the pioneer of crane builder in the United States. By 1880, they had established branches in Philadelphia, Boston and Chicago.

In the early 20th century, the company expanded its international sectors and engaged in global market by conducting partnership, mergers and acquisitions, and joint ventures with other companies in the same industry. In addition, the firm increased employment to more than 12,000 people, along with the business expansion.

As one of its business expansions, Yale established a British operation by acquiring the business of H&T Vaughan, a long- established lock manufacturer in Wood Street, Willenhall. The acquisition allowed the firm to be the historic centre of the British lock industry, and became the major employer in the town.

Then, the British Yale became involved in the early motor industry and supplied locks to various manufacturers when the cheaper diecast-based leaf tumbler technology became available. Yale saw an unexpected revival of activity in the motor trade from the 1960s onwards when security fitters adopted its "M69" window lock as a simple add-on fitting to prevent theft, especially on vans. This trend continued until the early 1990s, when it was superseded by electronic devices.

The firm continued to supply all lock requirements to Rolls-Royce Motors until 1991, when there was an acrimonious parting. However, the British business had been sold by its parent to merge with the Valor Company to form Yale & Valor in 1987. After a further takeover by Williams Holdings, various sections of the Willenhall operation and outlying operation such as their diecasting foundry were closed.

In March 2000, the remainder of the British business, especially Yale Security subsidiaries, was sold to Assa Abloy which were producing fire alarm systems, burglar alarms and glass break detectors.

Between July 2012 and late spring of 2013, Assa Abloy started to relocate Yale's factories from Lenoir City, Tennessee, their home since 1953, to Berlin, Connecticut.

Historical projects 

Non-exhaustive list of historical projects of the Yale Lock Company, on which they equipped the buildings with the locks and hardware.
Metropolitan Life Insurance Company Tower, headquarter of the Metropolitan Life Company, 1909
Woolworth Building, headquarter of the  Woolworth Company, 1912
New York Life Building, headquarter of the New York Life Company, 1927
Lincoln Building, built in 1930
Chrysler Building, headquarter of the Chrysler Corporation, 1930

See also
Yale-Cady Octagon House and Yale Lock Factory Site
Business Technology Association
Chubb Locks
Westminster Group

References

External links 

Yale regional sites

Lock manufacturers
Manufacturing companies established in 1868
1868 establishments in Connecticut